The Papers of Benjamin Franklin is a collaborative effort by a team of scholars at Yale University, American Philosophical Society and others who have searched, collected, edited, and published the numerous letters from and to Benjamin Franklin, and other works, especially those involved with the American Revolutionary period and thereafter. The publication of Franklin's papers has been an ongoing production since its first issue in 1959, and is expected to reach near fifty volumes, with more than forty volumes completed as of 2022. The costly project was made possible from donations by the American Philosophical Association and Life magazine. 

Of the sources used to cover Franklin's life, Franklin biographer Henry Brands has maintained that the major source for Franklin's life among historians are his own correspondence and writings, and in particular, Franklin's autobiography. He considers The Papers of Benjamin Franklin,  "by far the best" and "a model of scholarly editing". Biographer Walter Isaacson has referred to The Papers of Benjamin Franklin  as "definitive and extraordinary" noting that while several publications of Franklin's papers exist, this ongoing publication is the most complete and scholarly. The first editor to amass and organize the papers was Leonard W. Labaree, beginning in 1959. Since then a good number of editors have and continue to oversee this task. Works and collections other than the continuing Yale/APS publication have also been published and are nominally featured here.

Provenance 
During Franklin's adult life, as a learned man, he saved his correspondence and other writings with posterity in mind. When he embarked for France in 1776, he entrusted his many papers, contained in a large chest, which included his correspondence while in England and the manuscript of his Autobiography, to his old friend, Joseph Galloway, who kept them at his home in Trevose Manor aside Philadelphia. Upon the occupation of Philadelphia by the British, Galloway's estate was searched and confiscated and in the haste Franklin's papers were scattered about in and outside the house, where some were destroyed by the weather. Though a good friend with Franklin and other patriots who were advocating American independence, Galloway remained an unyielding Loyalist, and in June 1778 fled Philadelphia with the British, leaving, among other things, Franklin's papers behind. When Franklin learned of Galloway's situation and of the seizure on his estate, he became apprehensive about what had become of his papers and wrote to his son-in-law, Richard Bache, about matters. Bache followed up and discovered the trunk, which had been broke open and with some of its papers scattered about. Bache collected all that he could, and in a letter of June 20, 1781 informed Franklin of his discovery and effort. Franklin wrote back repeatedly to Bache, urging him to look further, but to no avail. Subsequently, some of Franklin's letters, pamphlets and manuscripts from before 1775 were irretrievably lost. Historian, and one of the early editors of The Papers of Benjamin Franklin, Whitfield Bell, said that it was a "marvel" that any of the Franklin's papers entrusted to Galloway had survived at all.

The original papers of Benjamin Franklin are the property of approximately three hundred owners. About one-third of them are private individuals which include both the descendants of Franklin and his correspondents, while other owners include autograph, book and manuscript collectors. The other two thirds of the Franklin papers belong to institutions, including libraries, historical societies, public archives, or other such institutions. In 1954, various institutions came together and offered their collections of Franklin papers for photo-copying by a full-time editorial staff working at the editorial headquarters situated within the Yale University Library, where they continue to be collated and prepared for publication.

APS and Yale publication

The Papers of Benjamin Franklin was established in 1953 under the joint auspices of American Philosophical Society and Yale University, both of whom were in possession of thousands of Franklin's letters and other writings. Historian Carl Becker maintains that Franklin "was acquainted personally or through correspondence with more men of eminence in letters, science and politics than any other man of his time". Historian John Bach McMaster, who wrote extensively about Franklin's letter writing, characterized Franklin as "a man of letters". Franklin biographer, Carl Van Doren, said of Franklin that, "letter writing with him was a form of art". 

Beginning in 1951, the National Historical Publications Commission listed sixty-six prominent Americans whose writings they considered "of such outstanding importance that they need to be published", with the expectation that they would provide invaluable insights into American history. Benjamin Franklin's name was at the top of that list. Many historians were in agreement with that assertion, in that no American during the eighteenth century had influenced his age and country, or made greater contributions in many varied aspects, than Franklin had. During the first half of the twentieth century, many of Franklin's letters and documents had come to light but existed as separate collections, or in private and public libraries and other institutions. As such, it was deemed necessary to record and compile this scattered conglomeration of papers and amass and sort them into one large publication and made available to all historians, scholars and students.

The project was first funded by a donation of $425,000 from Life Magazine, and $175,000 from the American Philosophical Society, and later by grants from foundations, individuals, and from the National Historical Publications and Records Commission and the National Endowment for the Humanities.

The project to publish Franklin's thousands of papers and other documents began in 1952 at the home of Alfred Whitney Griswold, Yale University's president, where the extensive collection of William Mason Smith at the Sterling Memorial Library was discussed. In autumn of that year, advice from Leonard W. Labaree, a member of the Yale history department for 42 years, was requested, with the hopes that a new edition of Franklin's papers would result. The Franklin project was inspired by a similar project involving the papers of Thomas Jefferson at Princeton University. Labaree made it clear that no such project could reach fruition without the full cooperation of the American Philosophical Society. Several meetings were held in Philadelphia, under the auspices of Society president, Justice Owen J, Roberts, an agreement was made and the joint sponsorship formally established in 1953. Editors and editorial offices were selected and on the 248th anniversary of Franklin's birth a public announcement was made about the commencement of the project. The Director of Yale University Press, Chester Kerr, gave assurances that nothing but the best printing, design and materials would be employed in the production of the Franklin Papers. A comprehensive listing of the Franklin Papers can be viewed at the National Archives.

The project has been ongoing, and as of 2022, forty-three volumes have been published and is expected to reach forty-seven, and will include some 30,000 extant papers. More than half of the overall collection of papers are in possession of the American Philosophical Society. Each of the volumes have their own index, with a cumulative index at the end. Much of Franklin's literary works have never been reprinted since they first appeared in the 1720s and 1730s. The publishes at Yale University hold that the project will add usefully to the existing body of early American materials. Of special interests to collectors will be the reproduction in photographic facsimile, for the first time, of the entire twenty-four pages of the "first impression" of the first Poor Richard's Almanack, taken from a one-of-a-kind copy housed in the Rosenbach Museum and Library in Philadelphia.

The Papers of Benjamin Franklin project is considered to have offered new scholarly information, with significant work being done on Franklin's life that has resulted in a new level of sophistication during the second half of the twentieth century. Today scholars and students have available to them more information and historical analysis on Franklin and his associations than those of previous generations.

Several publications of Franklin's papers were issued prior to the APS-Yale publication, which includes those of editors Jared Sparks (1836–1840), John Bigelow (1900-1903) and Albert Henry Smyth (1905-1906).

Yale collection 
This collection, originally referred to at Yale as the Mason-Franklin Collection, is the most extensive collection of works, letters and documents by or about Franklin and his times. It also includes various books and pamphlets owned and sometimes printed by Franklin, with some of them having imprints used by Franklin as a printer. The collection was first amassed early in the twentieth century by William Smith Mason of Yale who graduated in the class of 1888. The collection was housed at his home in Evanston, Illinois, where he hired a personal librarian to assist him in gathering materials, and for their organization and care.

The Mason-Yale collection also consists of a sizeable assortment of pictorial material, which includes an original contemporary oil portrait of Franklin, considered to be historically important, a few other oils paintings, and several hundred contemporary and later portraits of Franklin and his associates. The remaining pictures have been sorted and stored in cases where they have been made available for future reference. There are also a number of art objects of significance in the Mason-Yale collection, which include several marble busts which have been put on display at the library. The collection also includes a number of  small sculptures in bronze and porcelain, and along with some bronze medallions.

APS collection 
Franklin began saving his correspondence, documents and other papers as a young man. Over the course of his life he had amassed a huge collection of letters and other papers, which, two years before his death, he bequeathed to his grandson, William Temple Franklin. William used them in his authorship of, The Life and Writings of Benjamin Franklin. William stored Benjamin's massive collection at the home of George Fox near Philadelphia. When William embarked for England in 1817 he brought with him a portion for use in completion of a six volume work, Calendar of the papers of Benjamin Franklin, a comprehensive work on Benjamin's writings and correspondence.  Before William Temple died in 1823 he bequeathed the collection to George Fox, who in turn bequeathed it to his children, Charles P. Fox and Mary Fox. In July 1840 his children handed over the collection to The American Philosophical Society who gained formal possession in September that year.

Not included were a small portion of Franklin papers which had become mixed with the Fox family papers that were also stored in a loft of the stable at Champlost. The misplaced Franklin papers were discovered twenty-two years later when the loft was being cleaned out by a house guest of the Fox family, Mrs. Holbrook.  In 1903 these were purchased from her descendants by friends of the University of Pennsylvania, which became part of its library. The University of Pennsylvania eventually gave them as a gift to the American Philosophical Society.

Other collections 
In addition to the APS and Yale collections, there are other significant collections of Franklin's papers including those at the, Historical Society of Pennsylvania, University of Pennsylvania in Philadelphia, the William Clements Library at the University of Michigan, and the Huntington Library in San Marino, California.

The Library of Congress has a collection of Franklin's papers, consisting of approximately 8,000 items, most of them dating from the 1770s and 1780s. The papers consist of correspondence to Franklin as an early American publisher, scientist, and diplomat beginning with the year 1726. The majority of them date from the 1770s and 1780s. The collection's is mostly devoted to Franklin's diplomatic roles as a colonial representative during his stay in London (1757 to 1762 and 1764 to 1775) and while in France (1776–1785), where he successfully won the recognition and funding from European countries during the American Revolution. After the war he negotiated the Treaty of Paris with Great Britain that resolved most differences between the former adversaries which brought an end to that seven-year war. Franklin also served as the first United States minister to France. The Franklin papers also document his work as an inventor, scientist, and many involvements with his family, friends, along with his many scientific and political associates.

Franklin often corresponded with George Washington, Thomas Jefferson and other such notable figures, where some of these items are also considered part of The Papers of these individuals also. Those among the George Washington Papers contain approximately 62 items to or from Franklin, with some papers making reference to Franklin etc.  The Papers of Thomas Jefferson contain 55 items to or from Franklin with many of them documenting Franklin's diplomatic capacity while representing America in France during and briefly after the American Revolution. There are three items from Franklin among The Papers of James Madison.

Selected writings

Many of the Franklin Papers consist of letters to or from relatively unknown individuals, involving events or issues of relatively little importance. Other letters and writings, however, relate to people and events that are of great significance in terms of Franklin's life, his views and beliefs, and American history. A selection of such examples are outlined below in chronological order.

 In 1722, at the age of sixteen, Franklin wrote and published a series of fourteen letters under the assumed name of Silence Dogood with the pretension of a widowed women, a fictitious character wholly conceived by Franklin. The letters appeared in The New-England Courant, a newspaper owned by his older brother James, who, Benjamin feared, would not publish them if he knew who had actually written them. The letters, slipped under the door of James’ printing shop, paid homage to a Puritan clergyman, Cotton Mather, and among other things were also critical commentaries about society in colonial America, and are contained in The Papers of Benjamin Franklin, volume one.

 Beginning in 1732 Franklin began publication of his Poor Richard's Almanack which was generally well received by the public, but it also won him some encounters from those who were less than friendly. In 1736, writing under the assumed name of "Richard Saunders", Franklin wrote and published a letter of thanks in his almanack to his readership, which relates to instances where he is approached by ill-wishers. The letter is contained in volume two of The Papers of Benjamin Franklin.
 In July 1754, at the beginning of the French and Indian War, Franklin proposed the Albany Plan, a plan of Union to create a colonial government to unify the Thirteen Colonies at the Albany Congress, to plan a defense against an Iroquois and French alliance, and to form a treaty with the Mohawk Indians. Franklin presented the Albany Congress a rough draft of a plan for union, acting as a member of the committee which received all plans offered and debated. After much debate the various plans were combined into a final draft. However, it is uncertain as to what extent the plan was authored by Franklin, as several other delegates were actively involved. The plan, however, was ultimately rejected by the colonies and the British government, though its various measures would later have influence over future colonial policies. Franklin wrote at length about the proceedings and debates, the papers of which are outlined in The Papers of Benjamin Franklin, volume five.
 When Franklin went to England in 1757 he met William Strahan a prominent printer and publisher, and from 1774 to 1784, a member of Parliament. They became good friends and lifelong correspondents. Many of Strahan's Parliamentary reports were reprinted in The Pennsylvania Gazette in Philadelphia, owned by Franklin. Strahan often provided Franklin with printing materials and books for Franklin's printing office and bookstore in Philadelphia, involving much business correspondence to this effect. There are approximately 130 surviving letters between the two men, many of which have been reprinted in The Papers of Benjamin Franklin. When Strahan voted with Parliament, declaring patriots as "rebels", Franklin, in a letter of July 5, 1775, which he never sent, also declared that, "You and I were long Friends: You are now my Enemy, and I am, Yours".

 The Franklin Papers also contain many of Franklin's anonymous writings he had published in newspapers. In 1766, while in London, using the assumed name of Pacificus Secundis, he wrote extensively in the newspaper debate against the Stamp Act of 1765, which was fundamental in leading to its repeal that year, many writings of which are contained in volume 13 of The Papers of Benjamin Franklin.
Up until that time, no other event in Franklin's life had given him as much notoriety as his examination of the repeal of the Stamp Act before the House of Commons. In a letter of January 6, 1766, presented to Parliament, Franklin stated, 
"In my own private judgment, I think an immediate repeal of the Stamp Act would be the best measure for this country ; but a suspension of it for three years, the best for that. The repeal would fill them with joy and gratitude, reestablish their respect and veneration for Parliament, restore at once their ancient and natural love for this country." 
The voluminous letter, containing dozens of rhetorical questions to which Franklin offered answers, is reprinted in the Papers of Benjamin Franklin, and in its entirety in a work by Jared Sparks (ed.), 1836–1840.

 In June 1767 the British Parliament passed the Townsend Acts, which, among other measures, imposed taxes on a number of commodities, including tea, paper, glass, lead and paints sold in the colonies. The Acts were received with much resentment and resistance.  When news of the colonist's anger reached Franklin in London he wrote a number of essays in 1768 calling for "civility and good manners", though he did not approve of the measures. In 1770, Franklin continued writing essays against Lord Hillsborough and the Townsend Acts and wrote eleven that were highly critical of the Acts that appeared in the Public Advertiser, a daily newspaper issued in London. The essays were published between January 8 and February 19, 1770, and can be found in volume 17 of The Papers of Benjamin Franklin.

 In a letter of June 3, 1772, to The London Packet, Franklin wrote of religious tolerance:
"If we look back into history for the character of present sects in Christianity, we shall find few that have not in their turns been persecutors, and complainers of persecution. The primitive Christians thought persecution extremely wrong in the Pagans, but practiced it on one another. The first Protestants of the Church of England, blamed persecution in the Roman church, but practiced it against the Puritans. ... To account for this we should remember, that the doctrine of toleration was not then known, or had not prevailed in the world. Persecution was therefore not so much the fault of the sect as of the times."

 In response to the Boston Tea Party, Parliament in March 1774, passed the Intolerable Acts, one of which called for the closing of Boston Harbor, ceasing all shipping into or from Boston. News of the Acts reached the colonies in May, and they immediately formed what came to be known as the First Continental Congress where representatives from the several colonies assembled and proposed a colonial-wide boycott of British goods. Franklin's loyalist son, William Franklin, saw this as an opportunity to convince his father to return from London to America, writing him letters in that everyone valued his experience and wanted him to participate during that unstable time, and that the proposed boycott was "absurd". Benjamin responded in anger and chided him over the position he had taken and over his royal governorship in New Jersey. Knowing his letters were opened and read by British authorities, Franklin at this time also wrote to various figures in America urging them to support the First Continental Congress and their boycott of British goods through the Continental Association. Four hundred of Franklin's outbound letters, were sent to Philadelphia, and 145 sent to Boston. Another 250 letters bore a London address. During this time Franklin received some 850 letters from correspondents in America and 629 from England.
 Franklin embarked for France on October 26, 1776, and after a short but rough 30-day passage across the Atlantic his ship landed at Quiberon, which Franklin announced in a letter of December 8, 1776, to the Committee of Secret Correspondence upon his arrival at Nantes, assuring them that, "I am made extremely welcome here, where America has many friends. As soon as I have recovered strength enough for the journey...I shall set out for Paris. My letter to the President  will inform you of some other particulars." Franklin took up residence in Passy, then just outside of Paris, where he set up his printing press to assist him in his diplomatic efforts, translating into French and printing all important American documents for distribution. In another letter to the committee, dated May 1, 1777, Franklin revealed,
"Tyranny is so generally established in the rest of the world that the prospect of an asylum in America for those who love liberty gives general joy, and our cause is esteemed the cause of all mankind." 
Franklin, along with Silas Deane and Arthur Lee, began forging political and trade alliances with France, and other countries that would sympathize with the American cause for independence, always keeping the Committee informed about their efforts through correspondence. After a year in France, in a letter of October 14, 1777, to a former friend David Hartley, also a fellow scientific inventor and now a member of Parliament, in unforgiving tones, Franklin proclaimed that Parliament was "unfit and unworthy to govern us".
 
 In 1778, Silas Deane, envoy to France, serving with Franklin and Arthur Lee, credited for obtaining the Treaty of Alliance with France, and for recruiting Lafayette and Baron von Steuben to the American cause, became the subject of alleged financial and trade improprieties between France and America. In his defense Franklin wrote two letters of commendation to Henry Laurens, president of the Second Continental Congress, on Deane's behalf, both dated, March 31, 1778.

 After General Washington's victory during the Siege of Yorktown, in October 1781, communicated to Franklin while in Passy in a letter by French Foreign Minister Vergennes, Franklin remained less than optimistic about prospects for a lasting peace with Britain. In a letter of March 4, 1782, to Robert Livingston, Franklin warned that,
"The ministry, you will see, declare that the war in America is for the future to be only defensive. I hope we shall be too prudent to have the least dependence on this declaration. It is only thrown out to lull us; for, depend on it, the king hates us cordially, and will be content with nothing short of our extirpation."

 In 1783, after the Treaty of Paris between the United States and Britain had been settled, which Franklin played a major diplomatic role in, he received a letter of July 22, 1784, mailed on August 6, from his Loyalist son William Franklin, who sought to reconcile differences that had emerged between the two during the Revolution. Benjamin had long hoped to reestablish family ties with his son whom he had not heard from since 1775. He could not understand why William had not “made any Overtures towards a Reconciliation,” previously, now that peace was at hand. He reasoned that if countries could reconcile, why not family members? Writing from Passy, in a letter of August 16, 1784, Franklin responded to his son, writing,
"It will be very agreable to me. Indeed nothing has ever hurt me so much and affected me with such keen Sensations, as to find my self deserted in my old Age by my only Son; and not only deserted, but to find him taking up Arms against me, in a Cause wherein my good Fame, Fortune and Life were all at Stake. You conceived, you say, that your Duty to your King & Regard for your Country requir’d this. I ought not to blame you for differing in Sentiments with me in Public Affairs. We are Men, all subject to Errors."

See also

 Founding Fathers of the United States
 The Autobiography of Benjamin Franklin
 Leonard Woods Labaree and Whitfield J. Bell, editors of The Papers of Benjamin Franklin

Notes

Citations

Bibliography

Other works involving Franklin's writings

 
 
 
 
 
 
 
 (Not to be confused with the subject of this article: Covers Franklin's literary style, use of capitols, italics, contractions, etc.)
 
 ;  Volume II,   Volume III
 Twelve volumes with numerous examples of Franklin's writings to and from the founders and other notable figures.

External links
 National Archives: Search Franklin letters
 Benjamin Franklin Papers at the University of Pennsylvania
 Library of Congress: Calendar of the papers of Benjamin Franklin in the library of the University of Pennsylvania
 National Archives: The Colonist’s Advocate: I, 4 January 1770, Franklin's essay to a newspaper
 Indexes to the volumes, Yale University
 Franklin Papers.org at Yale University
 National Archives, list of letters in chronological order

American Revolution
Publications of the United States
Benjamin Franklin
Archives in the United States
American history books
History of the United States journals